Lām with tah above (also known as "Arabic letter Lām with small Tah above" or "arlām") is a character used in the Shahmukhi alphabet for the Punjabi language to represent a voiced retroflex lateral approximant and is also used in the Kalasha language.

The Gurmukhi equivalent of the letter is ਲ਼. This was added to Gurmukhi officially relatively recently, and is not universal, but does have a precedent for use in older Punjabi texts.

It was added to Unicode in 2020 (in version 13). Due to the recency of this addition, support is still limited among widely fonts. it is possible to approximate the letter using the character combination لؕ. The character is the sole member of the script group "Arabic letter for Punjabi."

History
The earliest source which attested a use of an arlam glyph identified in discussions of the proposed Unicode character was Muhammad Yar's 1792 Afarinish Nama. Though present in some older works, most writing historically has not included a character for the Punjabi phoneme it represents, and there are other characters which writers have used to represent this sound in the absence of a standard for it. Gurmeet Kaur's 2017 'Fascinating Folktales of Punjab' was printed with a version of the lam glyph with a dot beneath, mirroring the differentiation present on lalle pair bindi in Gurmukhi.

Forms

Character encoding

Font support 
As of August 2022, these font families support U+08C7:
 PakType 
 NoName Fixed 
 Noto Urdu Nastaleeq 
 Scherezade New

See also 

ٹ
ݨ
ڈ
ڑ

References 

Arabic letters
Shahmukhi alphabet